The 1964 United States presidential election in Illinois took place on November 3, 1964, as part of the 1964 United States presidential election. State voters chose 26 representatives, or electors, to the Electoral College, who voted for president and vice president.

Illinois was won by incumbent President Lyndon B. Johnson (D–Texas), with 59.47% of the popular vote, against Senator Barry Goldwater (R–Arizona), with 40.53% of the popular vote. , this is the last election in which Adams County, DeWitt County, Effingham County, Logan County, Menard County, Morgan County, Scott County, Wabash County, and Wayne County voted for a Democratic presidential candidate. This would be the last time until 1992 that Illinois would vote for a Democrat in a presidential election.

Primaries

Turnout
Turnout in the preference vote of the primaries was 17.77%, with a total of 917,314 votes cast.

Turnout in the general election was 84.97%, with a total of 4,702,841 votes cast. Both major parties held non-binding state-run preferential primaries on April 14.

Democratic

The 1964 Illinois Democratic presidential primary was held on April 14, 1964, in the U.S. state of Illinois as one of the Democratic Party's state primaries ahead of the 1964 presidential election.

In this election, all candidates were write-ins.

The preference vote was a "beauty contest". Delegates were instead selected by direct-vote in each congressional districts on delegate candidates.

Incumbent president Lyndon B. Johnson overwhelmingly won the primary.

While he received 3.23% of the vote, Robert F. Kennedy was not an active candidate for the nomination.

Republican

The 1964 Illinois Republican presidential primary was held on April 14, 1964, in the U.S. state of Illinois as one of the Republican Party's state primaries ahead of the 1964 presidential election.

The preference vote was a "beauty contest". Delegates were instead selected by direct-vote in each congressional districts on delegate candidates.

Results

Results by county

See also
 United States presidential elections in Illinois

References

Illinois
1964
1964 Illinois elections